Ørnulf Reidar Andresen (born 6 January 1944) is a Norwegian cyclist. He was born in Ski, and is a brother of Thorleif Andresen. He competed at the 1968 Summer Olympics in Mexico City, where he placed fifth in team trial with the Norwegian team.

References

External links 
 
 
 

1944 births
Living people
People from Ski, Norway
Norwegian male cyclists
Olympic cyclists of Norway
Cyclists at the 1968 Summer Olympics
Sportspeople from Viken (county)